Ponor Korenički is a village in Plitvička Jezera municipality in Lika-Senj County, Croatia.

References

Populated places in Lika-Senj County